Roma Agrawal   is an Indian-British-American chartered structural engineer based in London. She has worked on several major engineering projects, including the Shard. Agrawal is also an author and a diversity campaigner, championing women in engineering.

Early life and education 
Agrawal was born in Mumbai, India, before moving to London. She also lived in Ithaca, New York, for over five years, becoming an American citizen, and returned to London to complete her A-Levels at North London Collegiate School. In 2004, she gained a BA in physics from the University of Oxford, and in 2005, an MSc in Structural Engineering from Imperial College London.

Agrawal attributes her enthusiasm for engineering to her love of making (and breaking) things, cultivated by playing with Lego as a child. Agrawal attributes her entry into engineering to a summer placement at the Oxford Physics Department where she worked alongside engineers who were designing particle detectors for CERN.

Career 

In 2005, Agrawal joined Parsons Brinckerhoff (later called WSP) on a graduate program, becoming a chartered engineer with the Institution of Structural Engineers in 2011. She spent six years working on the tallest building in Western Europe, the Shard, designing the foundations and the iconic spire. She describes the project as a career highlight: "I think projects like that only come once or twice in your career, so I feel very fortunate to have had the opportunity to work on this". The spire required modular construction that could be built and tested off-site, enabling quick and safe assembly at height in central London.

Alongside the Shard, Agrawal worked on Crystal Palace Station and the Northumbria University Footbridge. She worked for WSP for ten years before joining Interserve as a Design Manager in November 2015. In May 2017, Agrawal joined AECOM as an associate director.

In 2018 Agrawal was appointed Member of the Order of the British Empire (MBE). She was appointed a Fellow of the Institution of Civil Engineers in 2018  and elected an Honorary Fellow of the Royal Academy of Engineering in 2021

Awards 
 2011: Institution of Structural Engineers Young Structural Engineer of the Year 2011
 2013: BDO's British Indian Awards Best in Science & Engineering Winner
 2014: Women in Construction Awards Engineer of the Year
 2015: Association for Consultancy and Engineering Diamond Award for Engineering Excellence
 2017: Institution of Structural Engineers Lewis Kent Award
 2017: Royal Academy of Engineering Rooke Award for Public Promotion of Engineering

Public engagement 
Following her six years working on The Shard, Agrawal found herself presenting on her work to children at school and students at university and found a passion for raising awareness of engineering. She has since presented to over 15,000 people worldwide.

Agrawal's career has been covered extensively in both online and print media. She was a founding member of the Your Life Campaign, designed to change school children's perception of science and engineering backed by the Department of Business, Innovation and Skills.

In 2014, she was part of Marks and Spencer's Leading Ladies campaign, alongside Annie Lennox, Emma Thompson and Rita Ora. Later that year, she was chosen as one of six women engineers to follow on Twitter by The Guardian. She has given two TEDx talks, "City 2.0" (2013) and "Three Moments that will Change the World" (2015). She has featured on several BBC, Channel 4, and Science Channel television programs. Since 2017, she has appeared as a judge on the Channel 4 reality programme Lego Masters and as a structural engineer expert on Mysteries of the Abandoned. She judged the trophy design competition for the Queen Elizabeth Prize for Engineering in 2015 and 2017.

Agrawal's book, titled Built: the Hidden Stories Behind our Structures, an introduction to structural engineering, was published in 2018. The IET E&T magazine described it as a "a treatise on structural engineering". They went on to say

Diversity 
In 2013, Agrawal was voted one of Management Todays Top 35 Women Under 35. She raises awareness through social media, podcasts and interviews. After being a finalist herself in 2012, she was a keynote speaker at the IET's Young Women Engineer of the Year award ceremony in 2016, and in 2017 was listed as one of the "Inspiring Women in Engineering" by the Women's Engineering Society.

Bibliography

References

External links 

 

1983 births
Living people
American structural engineers
British women engineers
Alumni of the University of Oxford
Alumni of Imperial College London
People educated at North London Collegiate School
Scientists from Mumbai
Members of the Order of the British Empire
Female Fellows of the Royal Academy of Engineering
21st-century women engineers
American women engineers
Indian women engineers
British structural engineers
Indian structural engineers
Indian emigrants to the United States
Indian emigrants to England
American emigrants to England
Lego people